Somalia competed at the 1996 Summer Olympics in Atlanta, United States. Somalia had missed out on the 1992 Games following the country's descent into lawlessness. The Somali National Olympic Committee sent a small delegation to the Atlanta Games, despite Somalia's still being without a government in 1996.

Results by event

Athletics

Men 

Track and road events

References
Official Olympic Reports

Nations at the 1996 Summer Olympics
1996
OLy